Dixon Glacier is located in the U.S. state of Montana in Glacier National Park.

See also
 List of glaciers in the United States
 Glaciers in Glacier National Park (U.S.)

References

Glaciers of Glacier County, Montana
Glaciers of Glacier National Park (U.S.)
Glaciers of Montana